Chile joined the International Monetary Fund (IMF) and International Bank for Reconstruction and Development (IBRD), the founding branch of the World Bank Group, on December 31, 1945.

History of Membership 

Chile was part of the original 44 member countries at the 1944 Bretton Woods Conference who signed its Articles of Agreement which pegged the world currencies to the dollar and established the IMF and the IBRD for short-term and long-term capital projects, respectively. Chile joined other branches of the World Bank Group relatively soon after their creation, they joined the International Development Association (IDA) on December 30, 1960, the International Finance Corporation (IFC) on April 15, 1957, and the Multilateral Investment Guarantee Agency (MIGA) the day it was established (April 12, 1988). The exception is the International Centre for Settlement of Investment Disputes (ICSID) which Chile joined on October 24, 1991, 25 years after its establishment.

Chile 
As of their June 2019 report, the World Bank considers Chile an emerging market and developing economy, defined by an economy that is 30% or more dependent on a single-export commodity. Copper ore (at $16.6B) and refined copper (at $14.9B) represent 45% of all Chilean exports.

Despite being rich in natural resources, wealth is poorly distributed, with 

Since independence, Chile's economy has mainly followed the principles of economic liberalism, whether it be classical liberalism or its 20th century revival "neoliberalism". Almost immediately after a CIA-sponsored coup d'état that deposed Salvador Allende and propped up the Military Dictatorship of Chile 1973-1990, a group of Chilean economists known as the Chicago Boys, as they were alumnus of the University of Chicago and Milton Friedman, published a study called El ladrillo.

Operation

The outcomes of these policies were praised by then Milton Friedman as the Miracle of Chile.

Chile suffered 1997 Asian financial crisis

Central Bank of Chile

Due to global  The World Bank predicts a slowdown in GDP growth from to 3% in 2021,

Current President and billionaire Sebastián Piñera

(2015-)  Chile Vamos party

a series of 2010-2012

Low approval rating

The World Bank frequently espouses Chile as a success story within Latin America. "Chile has been one of Latin America’s fastest-growing economies in recent decades, enabling the country to significantly reduce poverty. Between 2000 and 2017, the population living in poverty (on US$ 4 per day) decreased from 31% to 6.4%."

Past Development Projects of World Bank

Active Development Projects of World Bank 
In October  Strengthening State Universities in Chile, project  

In December 2017, the World Bank Group established an office Santiago, Chile.

Opposition 
Chile had generally been considered a model for stability and order within a tumultuous region through the economic model of Neoliberalism, a set of economic policies that advocate for a return to free-market capitalism and laissez-faire governmental policies toward the market

President Pinera 

2019 Chilean protests, where a 4 cent increase in metro fare expanded into an expression of general discontent towards growing economic inequality, such as high costs of living, stagnant wages and meager pensions.

According to Cadem, a

In response to the mass discontent, Piñera announced a major cabinet reshuffling, firing the Interior Minister Andrés Chadwick and Finance Minister Felipe Larrain.

References

World Bank Group relations
Economy of Chile